Saint-Mihiel is a commune in the Meuse department in Grand Est in north-eastern France.

Geography
Saint-Mihiel lies on the banks of the river Meuse.

History
A Benedictine abbey was established here in 708 or 709 by Count Wulfoalde and his wife Adalsinde. The library, containing over 9,000 works, is still on the original site.

During World War I, Saint-Mihiel was captured by the Germans in 1914, and was recaptured during the Battle of Saint-Mihiel by the American Expeditionary Forces (AEF) from 12 September to 19 September 1918.

Population

Features
Saint-Mihiel is known for its sculptures by Renaissance sculptor Ligier Richier (1500–1567).

Saint-Mihiel serves both as the starting and ending point of the 2014 video game Valiant Hearts: The Great War.

See also
Communes of the Meuse department
Léopold Durand
Sculptures by Ligier Richier
List of World War I memorials and cemeteries in the area of the St Mihiel salient

References

External links

 Official website. 

Saintmihiel
Duchy of Bar